Juan Silva (24 June 1930 – 2007) was a Chilean long-distance runner. He competed in the marathon at the 1956 Summer Olympics and the 1960 Summer Olympics.

References

1930 births
2007 deaths
Athletes (track and field) at the 1956 Summer Olympics
Athletes (track and field) at the 1959 Pan American Games
Athletes (track and field) at the 1960 Summer Olympics
Chilean male long-distance runners
Chilean male marathon runners
Olympic athletes of Chile
Sportspeople from Concepción, Chile
Pan American Games competitors for Chile
20th-century Chilean people